May Downs is a locality in the Isaac Region, Queensland, Australia.

Geography 
The Fitzroy Developmental Road forms the western boundary of the locality while the eastern boundary loosely follows the Isaac River. The land is predominantly used for cattle grazing.

References 

Isaac Region
Localities in Queensland